Erika Rosenova Zafirova (born 7 May 1999) is a Bulgarian rhythmic gymnast. She is the 2020 Olympic group all-around champion. She is the 2019 World group all-around bronze medalist and 5 balls silver medalist. She is the 2021 European 5 balls champion and 3 hoops + 4 clubs silver medalist. She won two silver medals and one bronze medal at the 2019 European Games.

Career 
Zafirova began rhythmic gymnastics when she was seven years old.

Individual 
Zafirova competed at the 2014 Junior European Championships with Boryana Kaleyn and Katerina Marinova, and they finished fourth in the team competition.

In the 2016 season, Zafirova became age eligible for senior competition. At the Moscow International Tournament, she finished eighth in the all-around. She then finished sixth in the all-around at the Corbeil Essonnes Cup.

Zafirova competed in her first World Challenge Cup at the 2017 Portimao World Cup where she finished sixth in the all-around and ball and fifth in the hoop. She won a silver medal in the ribbon behind Israeli gymnast Victoria Veinberg Filanovsky.

Group

2019 
In 2019, Zafirova joined Bulgarian senior group with Stefani Kiryakova, Madlen Radukanova, Laura Traets, and Simona Dyankova, replacing the injured Elena Bineva. The group won the gold medal in the 3 hoops + 4 clubs final and the silver medal in the group all-around at the Pesaro World Cup. Then at the Sofia World Cup, they won the group all-around gold medal. She represented Bulgaria at the 2019 European Games where the Bulgarian group won silver in the group all-around by only 0.050 behind Belarus. They also won the silver medal in the 5 balls final, this time behind Russia. In the 3 hoops + 4 clubs final, they won the bronze medal behind Belarus and Ukraine. She then competed at the World Championships in Baku where the Bulgarian group won the bronze medal in the group all-around behind Russia and Japan. They then won the silver medal behind Japan in the 5 balls final, and they placed fifth in the 3 hoops + 4 clubs final.

2021 
The Bulgarian team began their year at the Sofia World Cup, where the team won gold in the group all-around and in both apparatus finals. They once again swept the gold medals at the Baku World Cup. She then competed at the European Championships in Varna, Bulgaria. The Bulgarian team of the senior group, Boryana Kaleyn, and Katrin Taseva finished in fourth place. The Bulgarian group finished fifth in the all-around, but they won gold in the 5 balls final and won silver in the 3 hoops + 4 clubs final behind Israel.

Zafirova was selected to represent Bulgaria at the 2020 Summer Olympics alongside Laura Traets, Stefani Kiryakova, Madlen Radukanova, and Simona Dyankova. In the qualification round, the group qualified in first place after receiving the highest scores for both of their routines. In the group all-around final, they once again received the highest scores for both routines and won the gold medal with a total score of 92.100, 1.400 points ahead of Russia. This marked the first time a non-Russian team won the Olympic gold medal in the group all-around since Spain won in 1996, and it was the first time Bulgaria won the Olympic group all-around competition. The Bulgarian group withdrew from the World Championships in Kitakyushu, Japan, four days before the start of the competition, after an injury to Traets.

Personal life
Zafirova is engaged to David Huddleston, a Bulgarian artistic gymnast who also competed at the 2020 Summer Olympics.

Detailed Olympic results

References

External links
 

1999 births
Living people
People from Kyustendil
Bulgarian rhythmic gymnasts
Gymnasts at the 2019 European Games
European Games competitors for Bulgaria
European Games medalists in gymnastics
European Games silver medalists for Bulgaria
European Games bronze medalists for Bulgaria
Gymnasts at the 2020 Summer Olympics
Olympic gymnasts of Bulgaria
Olympic medalists in gymnastics
Olympic gold medalists for Bulgaria
Medalists at the 2020 Summer Olympics
Sportspeople from Kyustendil Province
21st-century Bulgarian women
20th-century Bulgarian women